Konrad Schäfer was a German physician who served as a researcher at the Institute for Aviation Medicine in Berlin.

After World War II, he was invited to the United States where he briefly conducted research for the U.S. Army Air Forces at Randolph Air Field.

He was tried and acquitted of various war crimes during the Doctors' trial.

References

Physicians from Berlin
1911 births
Year of death missing
German emigrants to the United States
People acquitted by the United States Nuremberg Military Tribunals